Lieutenant Murray Kenneth Guthrie was a World War I flying ace credited with six aerial victories.

Biography
Raised in Mobile, Alabama, Murray Kenneth Guthrie, was the son of K. R. Guthrie. He joined the United States Air Service in 1918.  Deployed to France, he was assigned to the 13th Aero Squadron, flying SPAD XIII aircraft. Eventually becoming a flight commander, he was credited with downing six Fokker D.VIIs, becoming was the highest scoring ace in his squadron.

After the war, Guthrie returned to Minnesota where he co-founded an advertising agency, became an officer in a financial institution and started a food supplement company. In 1951, he moved to Texas and became a rancher.

See also

 List of World War I flying aces from the United States

References

Bibliography
 American Aces of World War I. Norman Franks, Harry Dempsey. Osprey Publishing, 2001. , .

1896 births
1985 deaths
American people of Scottish descent
United States Army Air Service pilots of World War I
American World War I flying aces
Aviators from Minnesota
Recipients of the Distinguished Service Cross (United States)
United States Army officers